is a railway station in the city of Kashiwazaki, Niigata, Japan, operated by East Japan Railway Company (JR East).

Lines

Station layout
The station consists of two unnumbered ground-level opposed side platforms connected by a footbridge, serving two tracks. The station is unattended, but doubles as the local office of the Japan Agricultural Cooperatives (JA).

Platforms

History
The station was renamed to its present name on 20 March 1961. With the privatization of Japanese National Railways (JNR) on 1 April 1987, the station came under the control of JR East.

Surrounding area
Yoneyama Swimming Beach
Hassaki Post Office

See also
 List of railway stations in Japan

References

External links

 JR East station information 

Railway stations in Niigata Prefecture
Railway stations in Japan opened in 1897
Shin'etsu Main Line
Stations of East Japan Railway Company
Kashiwazaki, Niigata